Patryck Lanza dos Reis (born 18 January 2003), known as Patryck Lanza or simply Patryck, is a Brazilian professional footballer who plays as a left back for São Paulo.

On August 9, 2022, he was considered by the CBF as one of the young Brazilian players with the possibility of becoming a FIFA World Player of the Year.

Career statistics

Club

Honours

Brazil
FIFA U-17 World Cup
2019
Torneio Internacional do Espírito Santo (U-20)
2022
South American U-20 Championship
2023

References

External links

2003 births
Living people
Association football defenders
Brazilian footballers
São Paulo FC players
Brazil youth international footballers
People from Mogi Mirim